Nura 'Abd Allah al-Badi (born 1969) is an Omani poet.

Al-Badi is a resident of Al Buraimi. She studied at the College of Languages and Translation of Ajman University, and by profession works in the field of education. One volume of her poetry, Li-l-shahin jina hurr (The Falcon Has a Free Wing), was published in Cairo. She has also written a weekly newspaper column for Al Khaleej. Her radio series Kalimat al-haqq (The True Word) was created for Abu Dhabi radio, and she has also written the text of an operetta, Sawt al-ard (Voice of the Earth), on environmental themes. Her poetry has also been anthologized.

See also 

 Jokha Alharthi
 Nasra Al Adawi
 Huda Hamed

References

1969 births
Living people
Omani poets
Omani women poets
Omani women writers
Radio writers
Women radio writers
Omani journalists
Omani women journalists
Women columnists
20th-century Arabic poets
20th-century journalists
20th-century women writers
21st-century Arabic poets
21st-century journalists
21st-century women writers
People from Al Buraimi Governorate
Ajman University alumni
20th-century Omani people